Wilbur Wright Field was a military installation and an airfield used as a World War I pilot, mechanic, and armorer training facility and, under different designations, conducted United States Army Air Corps and Air Forces flight testing.  Located near Riverside, Ohio, the site is officially "Area B" of Wright-Patterson Air Force Base and includes the National Museum of the United States Air Force built on the airfield.

History

World War I
Logistics support to Wilbur Wright Field was by the adjacent Fairfield Aviation General Supply Depot established in January 1918 and which also supplied three other Midwest Signal Corps aviation schools. A Signal Corps Aviation School began in June 1917 for providing combat pilots to the Western Front in France, and the field housed an aviation mechanic's school and an armorer's school. Also in 1918, McCook Field near Dayton between Keowee Street and the Great Miami River began using space and mechanics at Wilbur Wright Field. Following World War I, the training school at Wilbur Wright Field was discontinued.

Training units assigned to Wilbur Wright Field
 42d Aero Squadron, August 1917
 Re-designated Squadron "I"; October 1918-February 1919
 44th Aero Squadron, August 1917
 Re-designated Squadron "K"; October 1918
 Re-designated Squadron "P"; November 1918-April 1919
 231st Aero Squadron (II), April 1918
 Re-designated Squadron "A", July–December 1918; Assigned to Armorers' School
 246th Aero Squadron (II), May 1918
 Re-designated Squadron "L", October 1918-February 1919
 342d Aero Squadron, August 1918
 Re-designated Squadron "M" October 1918
 Re-designated Squadron "Q" November 1918-April 1919
 507th Aero Squadron, July 1918-April 1919
 512th Aero Squadron (Supply), July 1918-April 1919
 669th Aero Squadron (Supply), May 1918-April 1919
 678th Aero Squadron (Supply), February 1918-April 1919
 851st Aero Squadron, March 1918
 Re-designated Squadron "B" July 1918-April 1919

Combat units trained at Wilbur Wright Field
 12th Aero Squadron, July–November 1917; Deployed to American Expeditionary Forces
 13th Aero Squadron, July–November 1917; Deployed to American Expeditionary Forces
 20th Aero Squadron, July–November 1917; Deployed to American Expeditionary Forces
 43d Aero Squadron, August–December 1917; Transferred to Ellington Field, Texas
 47th Aero Squadron, August 1917-February 1918; Deployed to American Expeditionary Forces
 149th Aero Squadron, August 1917-February 1918; Deployed to American Expeditionary Forces
 159th Aero Squadron, December 1917-February 1918; Deployed to American Expeditionary Forces
 162d Aero Squadron, December 1917-February 1918; Deployed to American Expeditionary Forces
 163d Aero Squadron, December 1917-February 1918; Deployed to American Expeditionary Forces
 166th Aero Squadron, December 1917-February 1918; Deployed to American Expeditionary Forces
 172d Aero Squadron, December 1917-February 1918; Deployed to American Expeditionary Forces

Service units trained at Wilbur Wright Field
 19th Aero Squadron, July–November 1917; Deployed to American Expeditionary Forces
 151st Aero Squadron, December 1917-February 1918; Deployed to American Expeditionary Forces
 211th Aero Squadron, December 1917-February 1918; Deployed to American Expeditionary Forces
 255th Aero Squadron, March–June 1918; Deployed to American Expeditionary Forces
 256th Aero Squadron; March–June 1918; Deployed to American Expeditionary Forces
 257th Aero Squadron; March–June 1918; Deployed to American Expeditionary Forces
 258th Aero Squadron; March–June 1918; Deployed to American Expeditionary Forces
 259th Aero Squadron; March–July 1918; Deployed to American Expeditionary Forces
 260th Aero Squadron; March–July 1918; Deployed to American Expeditionary Forces
 265th Aero Squadron; March–July 1918; Deployed to American Expeditionary Forces
 287th Aero Squadron, May–July 1918; Transferred to Chanute Field, Illinois
 288th Aero Squadron, May–July 1918; Transferred to Chanute Field, Illinois
 827th Aero Squadron (Repair), February–March 1918; Deployed to American Expeditionary Forces

Inter-war years
1923 records for speed, distance, and endurance were set by an April 16 Fokker T-2 flight from Wilbur Wright Field which used a  course around the water tower, the McCook Field water tower, and a pylon placed at New Carlisle.  In June 1923, an Air Service TC-1 airship "was wrecked in a storm at Wilbur Wright Field" and by 1924, the field had "an interlock system" radio beacon using Morse code command guidance (dash-dot "N" for port, dot-dash "A" for starboard) illuminating instrument board lights.  The Field Service Section at Wilbur Wright Field merged with McCook's Engineering Division to form the Materiel Division on 15 October 1926 ("moved to Wright Field when McCook Field closed in 1927").  The Air Service's "control station for the model airway"—which scheduled military flights of the Airways Section—moved to Wilbur Wright Field from McCook Field in the late 1920s (originally "at Bolling Field until 1925").

Redesignations
The Fairfield Air Depot formed when the leased area of Wilbur Wright Field and the Army-owned land of the Fairfield Aviation General Supply Depot merged soon after World War I.  For an aerial war game of 1929, "Fairfield" was the headquarters of the Blue air force: a Blue "airdrome north of Dayton at Troy" was strafed on May 16 ("a raid on the airdrome at Fairfield" was later expected), "Dayton" was the May 21 take off site for a round-trip bomber attack on New York, and "target areas at Fairfield" were used for live bombing on May 25.  A provisional division was "assembled at Dayton" on May 16, 1931, for maneuvers in which "Maj. Henry H. Arnold, division G-4 (Supply), had stocks at Pittsburgh; Cleveland; Buffalo; Middletown, Pennsylvania; Aberdeen, Maryland; and Bolling Field to service units as they flew eastward."  The depot remained active until 1946.

Wright Field 
In 1924, the city of Dayton purchased , the portion of Fairfield Air Depot leased in 1917 for Wilbur Wright Field, along with an additional  in Montgomery County to the southwest (now part of Riverside). The combined area was named Wright Field to honor both Wright Brothers. A new installation with permanent brick facilities was constructed to replace McCook Field and was dedicated on October 12, 1927. The transfer of 4,500 tons of engineering material, office equipment and other assets at McCook Field to Wright Field began on March 25, 1927, and was 85% complete by June 1 after moving 1,859 truckloads.  "The Engineering School shut down for the school year 1927-28 at Wright Field, which had the Army Air Corps Museum in Building 12.

By November 1930, "the laboratory at Wright Field" had planes fitted as flying laboratories" (e.g., B-19 "flying laboratory" with "8-foot tires"), and the equipment of the 1929 Full Flight Laboratory (closed out by the Daniel Guggenheim Fund for the Promotion of Aeronautics, which had established the principle of safe fog flying) was moved to Wright Field by the end of 1931.  Materiel Division’s Fog Flying Unit under 1st Lt. Albert F. Hegenberger used the equipment for blind landings.

Patterson Field
Patterson Field named for Frank Stuart Patterson was designated on 6 July 1931 as the area of Wright Field east of Huffman Dam (including Fairfield Air Depot, Huffman Prairie, and Wright Field's airfield).  Patterson Field became the location of the Materiel Division of the Air Corps and a key logistics center and in 1935,  quarters were built at Patterson Field which in 1939 still "was without runways...heavier aircraft met difficulty in landing in inclement weather."  Wright Field retained the land west of the Huffman Dam and became the research and development center of the Air Corps.

Pre-war events
Engineering and flight activities of the two installations after the designation of Patterson Field included numerous aviation achievements and failures prior to the bombing of Pearl Harbor:

AAF and USAF base

The Army Air Forces Technical Base was formed on December 15, 1945, when Wright Field, Patterson Field, Dayton Army Air Field in Vandalia and Clinton County AAF in Wilmington merged.  After the USAF was created, the base was renamed Air Force Technical Base in December 1947 and Wright-Patterson Air Force Base in January 1948..  The former Wright Field became Area B of the combined installation, the southern portion of Patterson Field became Area A, and the northern portion of Patterson Field, including the jet runway built in 1946–47, Area C.

References

Airfields of the United States Army Air Forces in Ohio
World War I airfields in the United States
World War I sites in the United States
Wright-Patterson Air Force Base
Airports established in 1917
1917 establishments in Ohio